Badger is a civil parish in Shropshire, England.  It contains eleven listed buildings that are recorded in the National Heritage List for England.  Of these, one is listed at Grade II*, the middle of the three grades, and the others are at Grade II, the lowest grade.  The parish contains the village of Badger and the surrounding countryside.  The listed buildings include houses and cottages, a church and a churchyard cross, two summer houses in the form of a Classical temples, and two bridges.


Key

Buildings

Notes and references

Notes

Citations

Sources

Lists of buildings and structures in Shropshire